Karomama II (full name Karomama Meritmut; also known as Karomama D, Merytmut II) was an ancient Egyptian queen, Great Royal Wife of pharaoh Takelot II of the 23rd Dynasty of Egypt.

Family
Karomama brought various titles such as King's Wife, King's Daughter, Mistress of Upper and Lower Egypt. She was a daughter of the High Priest of Amun Nimlot C and the lady Tentsepeh C. Her paternal grandparents were pharaoh Osorkon II and queen Djedmutesankh.

Karomama married pharaoh Takelot II and was mother of pharaoh Osorkon III. Karomama also was the grandmother of both pharaohs Takelot III and Rudamun and of the God's Wife of Amun Shepenupet I
Karomama is known from the Chronicle of Osorkon B at Karnak and the Nile Quay Texts dating to the reign of her son Osorkon III.

           Osorkon II = Djedmutesankh
                      |
                   Nimlot C = Tentsepeh C
                            |
                       Karomama II = Takelot II
                                   |
                               Osorkon III

References

Queens consort of the Twenty-third Dynasty of Egypt
People of the Twenty-second Dynasty of Egypt
9th-century BC Egyptian women
9th-century BC Egyptian people